The Vestiarium Scoticum (full title, Vestiarium Scoticum: from the Manuscript formerly in the Library of the Scots College at Douay. With an Introduction and Notes, by John Sobieski Stuart) was a book which was first published in 1842 by William Tait of Edinburgh in a limited edition. John Telfer Dunbar, in his seminal work History of Highland Dress, referred to it as "probably the most controversial costume book ever written".

The book itself is purported to be a reproduction, with colour illustrations, of a 15th-century manuscript on the clan tartans of Scottish families. Shortly after its publication it was denounced as a forgery, and the "Stuart" brothers who brought it forth were also denounced as impostors for claiming to be the grandsons of Bonnie Prince Charlie. It is generally accepted today that neither the brothers themselves nor the Vestiarium are what they were purported to be.

Nevertheless, the role of the book in the history of Scottish tartans is immense, with many of the designs and patterns contained therein passing into the realm of "official" clan tartans.

Background

The 1842 edition of the Vestiarium had its beginnings in the late 1820s, when the Sobieski Stuart brothers, then residents of Moray, Scotland, produced a copy of a document containing tartan patterns and showed it to their host, Sir Thomas Dick Lauder. This manuscript, however, was not the one that the brothers claimed to be the basis for the later publication of the Vestiarium.

As explained in the Preface to the 1842 edition (which is extensively excerpted in Dunbar's History of Highland Dress), the copy which Sir Thomas saw, now known as the Cromarty MS, which bore the date 1721 on the first page and with the title Liber Vestiarium Scotia, was said by its possessors to have been obtained from a certain John Ross of Cromarty, and was said also by them to be an inferior copy of an earlier manuscript.

In this same Preface, it is claimed that the 1842 edition is based on an original manuscript, now known as the Douay MS, whose date was claimed to be 1571 (or earlier), which was at that time in the possession of John Lesley, Bishop of Ross. This Douay MS is said by the author of the Preface to be the "oldest and most perfect" copy of the Vestiarium. Having once been in the possession of Bishop Ross, it had found its way subsequently into the library of the Scots College at Douay. From there, it was supposed to have come into the possession of Bonnie Prince Charlie himself, who took over the MS when on a visit to the Scots College in the early 1750s.

The Lauder–Scott correspondence

Soon after Sir Thomas saw the book, he wrote of it to Sir Walter Scott, in a letter dated 1 June 1829. In this letter, Lauder highly commended the book, stating that several clan chiefs, such as Cluny MacPherson and McLeod, had derived their "true and authentic" tartans therefrom. Lauder described the manuscript in detail, stating that he had obtained drawings, in colour, of all of the tartans contained therein (about 66 in number) and sent some of these to Sir Walter Scott himself. In addition to material on tartans, the book also contained appendices on women's plaids (arisaids) and on hose and trews. In the end, Lauder urged the brothers to have the book published and made inquiries concerning costs and procedures to that end. A plan was adopted to publish it, illustrated by swatches of silk in the tartan colours and patterns.

In his reply of 5 June 1829 Scott expressed scepticism over the claims of both the brothers Sobieski and the manuscript itself, at the same time requesting that a copy of the MS be sent for investigation by competent authorities in antiquities. Among other things, he disputed the assertion that Lowlanders had ever worn tartans or plaids, questioned the lack of any corroborating evidence (including any in Bishop Lesley's writings even though Lesley was said to have been in possession at one time of the original upon which the present MS was based), and called into question the authenticity of the brothers. He also noted that the title – Vestiarium Scoticum – was, in his words, "false Latin".

On 20 July 1829 Sir Thomas replied to Sir Walter. In this letter, he describes the (alleged) 1571 original from which the 1721 copy, which he saw, is said to be derived and which was in the possession of the brothers' father in London. Sir Thomas then goes on to discuss the brothers' character, credibility, and society's opinion of them, admitting that the "Quixotism of the two brothers must render these very unfortunate individuals for the introduction of a piece of antiquarian matter to the world…". He nevertheless reasserts his belief in the authenticity of the MS and goes on to discuss the "false Latin" and the presumed use of tartans in the Lowlands.

In a final letter in this exchange from Scott to Lauder, dated 19 November 1829, Scott rejected again the authenticity of the Vestiarium Scoticum and further rejected the notion that Lowlanders ever wore clan tartans. He went further and rejected the entire notion of clan tartans, stating that the "idea of distinguishing the clans by their tartans is but a fashion of modern date…".

Publication of the Vestiarium Scoticum

The Vestiarium was finally published in 1842. A summary of its contents follows.

 Preface, in which is described the origin of the manuscripts, together with observations on the supposed author and date
 Rolls of the Clans
 Introduction
 Text of the Vestiarium
 The setts, stripes, and colours of the tartans, together with a listing of clans and families whose tartans are described
 Colour plates - seventy five plates (in colour) illustrating the tartans of the clans and families mentioned in the previous section

Tartans

The tartans presented in the Vestiarium were divided into two sections. First came the "Highland clans" and this was followed by "Lowland Houses and Border Clans". In the listing below, the clan name (with original spelling as it appeared in the VS) is followed by the Scottish Tartans Society number (TS#) and the (modern) thread count. Please note that these may not be the official clan tartans. For example, the tartan shown for Clan Campbell, known as "Campbell of Argyll", was only worn by the Sixth Duke of Argyll. The standard Campbell tartan is the Black Watch tartan.

Hieland clannes (Highland Clans)

Low country pairtes (Lowland Clans)

Bordovr clannes (Border Clans)

The Quarterly Review

In June 1847, a highly critical review of the Vestiarium Scoticum was published in the Quarterly Review. Though the review was initially published anonymously, now the authors are now known to have been Professor George Skene of Glasgow University and Rev. Dr. Mackay, the editor of the Highland Society's Gaelic Dictionary.

The Quarterly Review article was occasioned by the appearance of a book by John Sobieski and Charles Edward Stuart entitled The Tales of the Century. These stories, although presented in fictional terms, lay out the authors' claims to be direct descendants of Prince Charles Edward, the Young Pretender. The Quarterly Review article, while nominally a response to these claims, in fact mainly consisted of an examination of the authenticity of the Vestiarium Scoticum.

In 1848, John Sobieski Stuart replied to the Quarterly Review article with a treatise of his own entitled The Genuineness of the Vestiarium Scoticum. In this reply, Stuart offered the 1721 edition for inspection. In his part, Skene expressed a desire for the original manuscript, which was said to have once belonged to Bishop Ross, to be exhibited. In the end, no record of anyone examining the 1721 copy at that time exists, and no one, other than the Sobieski Stuart brothers, ever saw the Ross copy.

In 1895, the Glasgow Herald published a series of articles titled "The Vestiarium Scoticum, is it a forgery?" authored by Andrew Ross. Ross was able to locate the 1721 copy, but not any earlier manuscripts. He gave a detailed description of the 1721 copy, and had it subjected to chemical testing by Stevenson Macadam, a chemist. Macadam reported that the "document [bore] evidence of having been treated with chemical agents in order to give the writing a more aged appearance than it is entitled to". He concluded that "the manuscript cannot be depended upon as an ancient document".

This 1721 copy was also presented for examination to a Mr. Robert Irvine, the director of a chemical firm who reported that it was "impossible to arrive at any accurate conclusion pointing to the age of the writing".

In earlier years, there was some discussion of publishing a second edition of the Vestiarium Scoticum (the first edition had a press run of only several dozen copies), but nothing came of these discussions.

See also
 Ossian
 Manuscripts of Dvůr Králové and of Zelená Hora

Notes

References

 John Telfer Dunbar, History of highland dress: A definitive study of the history of Scottish costume and tartan, both civil and military, including weapons, 
 Hugh Trevor-Roper, The Invention of Tradition: The Highland Tradition of Scotland, in The Invention of Tradition editors: Eric Hobsbawm and Terence Ranger. Cambridge University Press, 1983, 

Works cited
Stewart, Donald C. & Thompson, J Charles. & Scarlett James (editor). Scotland's Forged Tartans, An analytical study of the Vestiarium Scoticum. Edinburgh: Paul Harris Publishing, 1980. 
Stewart, Donald C. The Setts of the Scottish Tartans, with descriptive and historical notes. London: Shepheard-Walwyn, 1974.

External links
Two pictures of a copy of the Vestiarium Scoticum displayed in the Burns House Museum : both opened and closed  (an image of a tartan can be seen)
Scans of a copy of the Vestiarium Scoticum (including all tartans drawings) in the web site resources.scottishtartans.org
Scottish Tartans World Register
Scottish Tartan Authority

Scottish clothing
Literary forgeries
Tartan
1842 books